Tamakoshi is a rural municipality located within the Dolakha District of the Bagmati Province of Nepal. The municipality spans  of area, with a total population of 18,849 according to a 2011 Nepal census.

On March 10, 2017, the Government of Nepal restructured the local level bodies into 753 new local level structures. The previous Bhirkot, Jhule, Japhe, Malu, Sahare, Chyama and Hawa VDCs were merged to form Tamakoshi. Tamakoshi is divided into 7 wards, with Japhe declared the administrative center of the rural municipality.

References

External links

Rural municipalities in Dolakha District
Rural municipalities of Nepal established in 2017